All Over the Town is a 1949 British comedy film directed by Derek N. Twist and starring Norman Wooland, Sarah Churchill and Cyril Cusack. It was based on the 1947 novel by R. F. Delderfield.

Premise
After serving in the RAF during the Second World War, Nat Hearn (Norman Wooland) returns to his prewar job as a reporter on the Tormouth Clarion. He meets and is attracted to Sally Thorpe (Sarah Churchill), who had replaced him when he enlisted and has been given notice now he has returned. He arranges for her to be kept on and they spend time together and become engaged to marry. Later, Nat becomes a co-owner and editor of the paper, but the other co-owner disagrees with Nat's new editorial policy which often involves upsetting people who provide the paper with much of its advertising revenue. So he arranges for most of the staff to take holiday time-off simultaneously to prevent Nat's opposition to Tormouth council's proposed redevelopment scheme from which some councillors plan to profit personally. Despite this, at a public meeting called by the council, Nat and his small band of supporters manage to convince the locals to support Nat in the dispute.

Cast
 Norman Wooland as Nat Hearn
 Sarah Churchill as Sally Thorpe
 Cyril Cusack as Gerald Vane
 Ronald Adam as Sam Vane
 Bryan Forbes as Trumble
 James Hayter as Baines
 Fabia Drake as Miss Gelding
 John Salew as Sleek
 Stanley Baker as Barnes
 Edward Rigby as Grimmett
 Patrick Doonan as Burton
 Eleanor Summerfield as Beryl Hopper
 Trefor Jones as Tenor
 Sandra Dorne as Marlene
 Hubert Leslie as Skinner
 Henry Edwards as Major Martindale
 Frederick Leister as Wainer
 Patrick Macnee as Mr. Vince
 Anthony Oliver as PC Butt
 Erik Chitty as Frobisher
 Walter Horsbrugh as Mr. Thornton
 Lydia Bilbrook as Mrs Vane (uncredited)

Production
All Over the Town was the fourth of five films produced by Wessex Film Productions, a production company founded in 1947 by Ian Dalrymple and Jack Lee, both formerly of the Crown Film Unit. The film was shot in Lyme Regis.

Reception
The New York Times described it as a "slow, dogmatic little picture" with a "dog-eared" plot. In The Times, the film's plot was seen as unoriginal, executed "without inspiration or any originality of thought".

Later history
By the beginning of the 21st century, the only known surviving copy of the film was the negative at the BFI National Film and Television Archive. In 2005, the Lyme Regis Film Society commissioned the production of a new print from the negative. This copy of the film is housed in Lyme Regis Museum and has been shown at the local Regent Cinema on a few occasions. Since 2018, the film has been shown on the UK television channel Talking Pictures TV.

References

External links
 
 All Over the Town at the BFI Film & TV Database
Review of film at Variety

1949 films
Films about journalists
1949 comedy films
British comedy films
Films shot at Pinewood Studios
Films directed by Derek Twist
Films based on British novels
Films set in England
British black-and-white films
1940s English-language films
1940s British films